Éraste d'Odet d'Orsonnens (April 11, 1836 – December 24, 1906) was a notary, author and politician in Quebec. He served as mayor of Hull from 1889 to 1890. His name also appears as Jean-Éraste and Jean Protais Eraste.

The son of Colonel Protais d'Odet d'Orsonnens and Louise-Sophie Rocher, he was born in Saint-Roch-de-l'Achigan, Lower Canada, and was educated at L'Assomption and at the Jesuit college in Montreal. He went on to study law and was licensed as a notary at the age of 22. D'Orsonnens practised his profession in Montreal, Warwick and Hull. In 1875, he married Marie-Louise Fiset. D'Orsonnens was also a commissioner of the Superior Court of Quebec and chair of the Hull school board. Around the age of 50, he retired from practice as a notary to pursue his developing business. He served on Hull municipal council from 1877 to 1886 and from 1890 to 1891.

He published:
Felluna, la vierge iroquoise ; Une épluchette de blé-d'inde ; Une résurrection (1856) which is described as the first collection of stories published in Lower Canada
Une apparition : épisode de l'émigration irlandaise au Canada (1860)
Le moteur centripète (1899)

Rue D'Orsonnens in Hull, now part of Gatineau, was named in his honour.

References 

1836 births
1906 deaths
Mayors of places in Quebec